Villa Collemandina is a comune (municipality) in the Province of Lucca in the Italian region Tuscany, located about  northwest of Florence and about  north of Lucca.

Villa Collemandina borders the following municipalities: Castiglione di Garfagnana, Pieve Fosciana, San Romano in Garfagnana, Sillano Giuncugnano, Villa Minozzo.

Main sights
Sanctuary of Santa Maria del Soccorso
 Orto Botanico "Pania di Corfino", a botanical garden

References

Cities and towns in Tuscany